IROC X was the tenth year of IROC competition, which took place in 1986. It saw the use of the Chevrolet Camaro in all races, it was the final season that television coverage was on CBS,  and continued the format introduced in IROC VIII. Race one took place on the Daytona International Speedway, race two took place at Mid-Ohio, race three ran at Talladega Superspeedway, and race four concluded the year at Watkins Glen International. Al Unser Jr. won the championship and $164,100.

The roster of drivers and final points standings were as follows:

Race results

Race One, Daytona International Speedway
Friday, February 14, 1986

(5) Indicates 5 bonus points added to normal race points scored for leading the most laps.(3) Indicates 3 bonus points added to normal race points scored for leading the 2nd most laps(2) Indicates 2 bonus points added to normal race points scored for leading the 3rd most laps (did not occur in this race so not awarded).

Average speed: Cautions: 2Margin of victory: 40 feetLead changes: 1

Lap Leader Breakdown

Race Two, Mid-Ohio Sports Car Course
Saturday, June 7, 1986

(5) Indicates 5 bonus points added to normal race points scored for leading the most laps.(3) Indicates 3 bonus points added to normal race points scored for leading the 2nd most laps (Did not occur in this race so not awarded).(2) Indicates 2 bonus points added to normal race points scored for leading the 3rd most laps (Did not occur in this race so not awarded).

Average speed: Cautions: noneMargin of victory: 2.87 secLead changes: 0

Race Three, Talladega Superspeedway
Saturday, July 26, 1986

(5) Indicates 5 bonus points added to normal race points scored for leading the most laps.(3) Indicates 3 bonus points added to normal race points scored for leading the 2nd most laps(2) Indicates 2 bonus points added to normal race points scored for leading the 3rd most laps (Did not occur in this race so not awarded).

Average speed: Cautions: noneMargin of victory: 1 clLead changes: 1

Lap Leader Breakdown

Race Four, Watkins Glen International
Saturday, August 9, 1986

(5) Indicates 5 bonus points added to normal race points scored for leading the most laps.(3) Indicates 3 bonus points added to normal race points scored for leading the 2nd most laps(2) Indicates 2 bonus points added to normal race points scored for leading the 3rd most laps.

Average speed: Cautions: noneMargin of victory: 3 clLead changes: 3

Lap Leader Breakdown

Notes
 Klaus Ludwig and Hans Stuck tied for eighth place in the championship standings, but Ludwig was awarded the position due to a higher finishing position in the final race. Klaus Ludwig was scheduled to start fourth in the final race, but was moved to the back of the grid for not practicing.

 Hurley Haywood and Jochen Mass tied for tenth place, but Haywood was awarded the position due a higher finish in the final race.

References

External links
IROC X History - IROC Website

International Race of Champions
1986 in American motorsport